Time for 2 is a 1962 album by Anita O'Day and Cal Tjader.

Reception

Billboard magazine reviewed the album in their September 1, 1962 issue and wrote that "Tjader kicks in with some strong instrumental choruses and his combo accompanies in high style whether playing straight or Latin time".

Richard S. Ginell reviewed the reissue of the album for Allmusic and wrote that "O'Day sounds as if she is delighted with Tjader's polished Afro-Cuban grooves, gliding easily over the rhythms, toying with the tunes, transforming even a tune so locked into its trite time as "Mr. Sandman" into a stimulating excursion. Indeed, O'Day's freewheeling phrasing becomes downright sexy on "That's Your Red Wagon" and Dave Frishberg's delicious parody of a spoiled honeybunch, "Peel Me a Grape."" Ginell also praised producer Creed Taylor's "...obsession with good engineering and tasteful applications of reverb" which led to her voice sounding "much fuller and more attractive in his productions than on her Norman Granz-produced albums".

Track listing 
 "Thanks for the Memory" (Ralph Rainger, Leo Robin) – 2:45
 "It Shouldn't Happen to a Dream" (Duke Ellington, Don George, Johnny Hodges) – 2:59
 "Just in Time" (Betty Comden, Adolph Green, Jule Styne) – 2:47
 "Under a Blanket of Blue" (Jerry Livingston, Al J. Neiburg, Marty Symes) – 2:22
 "That's Your Red Wagon" (Gene De Paul, Richard M. Jones, Don Raye) – 2:49
 "Peel Me a Grape" (Dave Frishberg) – 3:03
 "An Occasional Man" (Ralph Blane, Hugh Martin) – 2:27
 "The Party's Over" (Comden, Green, Styne) – 2:20
 "I Believe in You" (Frank Loesser) – 2:23
 "Mr. Sandman" (Pat Ballard) – 1:55
 "Spring Will Be a Little Late This Year" (Loesser) – 3:24
 "I'm Not Supposed to Be Blue Blues" (Bob Russell) – 2:23

Personnel 
Anita O'Day – vocals
Cal Tjader – vibraphone
Bob Corwin, Lonnie Hewitt – piano
Freddy Schreiber – double bass
Wilfredo "Changuito" Vicente – congas
Johnny Rae – drums
Don Gold – liner notes
Al Schmitt – engineer
Creed Taylor – producer

References

1962 albums
Albums produced by Creed Taylor
Anita O'Day albums
Cal Tjader albums
Verve Records albums